Total Madness – the Very Best of Madness is a greatest hits album by a British ska/pop band Madness, released in 1997. It was released exclusively in the United States and Canada.

Critical reception
In a retrospective review for AllMusic, critic Stephen Thomas Erlewine gave the album three out of five stars and wrote that the album "[is] an overview of Madness in their decline, with a couple of earlier hits thrown in for good measure."

Track listing
 "Our House" (Cathal Smyth, Chris Foreman) - 3:20
 "It Must Be Love" (Labi Siffre) - 3:18
 "Tomorrow's (Just Another Day)" (Smyth, Michael Barson) - 3:09
 "Shut Up" (Foreman, Graham McPherson) - 3:26
 "Grey Day" (Barson) - 3:38
 "The Sun and the Rain" (Barson) - 3:30
 "Wings of a Dove (A Celebratory Song)" (Smyth, McPherson) - 3:03
 "Michael Caine" (Smyth, Daniel Woodgate) - 3:36
 "One Better Day" (McPherson, Mark Bedford) - 4:06
 "Uncle Sam" (Foreman, Lee Thompson) - 4:16
 "Yesterday's Men" (Foreman, McPherson) - 4:32
 "One Step Beyond" (Cecil Campbell) - 3:33 (Version exclusive to compilation)

References

External links

1997 greatest hits albums
Madness (band) compilation albums
Geffen Records compilation albums
Albums produced by Alan Winstanley
Albums produced by Clive Langer